Azure Lake is located in North Cascades National Park, in the U. S. state of Washington. It is difficult to access due to being in a remote location in the park, well off any maintained trails.

See also 
 Geography of the North Cascades

References

External links 
 Winter photo of Azure Lake: Flickr

Lakes of Washington (state)
North Cascades National Park
Lakes of Whatcom County, Washington